This is a list of township-level divisions of the province of Jilin, People's Republic of China (PRC). After province, prefecture, and county-level divisions, township-level divisions constitute the formal fourth-level administrative divisions of the PRC. There are a total of 1,023 such divisions in Jilin, divided into 252 subdistricts, 427 towns, 4 ethnic towns, 312 townships, and 28 ethnic townships. This list is divided first into the prefecture-level divisions then the county-level divisions.

Changchun

Chaoyang District
Subdistricts:
Nanhu Subdistrict, Hongqi Subdistrict, Mengjia Subdistrict, Baiju Subdistrict, Jianshe Subdistrict, Yongchang Subdistrict, Chongqing Subdistrict, Guilin Subdistrict, Kuanping Subdistrict, Huxi Subdistrict, Qinghe Subdistrict

Towns:
Datun, Leshan

Townships:
Shuangde Township, Yongchun Township

Erdao District
Subdistricts:
Heshun Subdistrict, Dongsheng Subdistrict, Rongguang Subdistrict, Jilin Subdistrict, Dongzhan Subdistrict, Yuanda Subdistrict, Balibao Subdistrict

Towns:
Sandao, Quannongshan

Townships:
Yingjun Township, Sijia Township, Quanyan Township

Kuancheng District
Subdistricts:
Xinfa Subdistrict, Shengli Subdistrict, Nanguang Subdistrict, Dongguang Subdistrict, Zhanqian Subdistrict, Xiguang Subdistrict, Liuying Subdistrict, Qunying Subdistrict, Kaixuan Subdistrict, Xingye Subdistrict, Tuanshan Subdistrict, Dong'an Subdistrict, Changtong Subdistrict

Towns:
Xinglongshan, Lanjia

The only township is Fenjin Township

Nanguan District
Subdistricts:
Nanjie Subdistrict, Taoyuan Subdistrict, Quan'an Subdistrict, Yongji Subdistrict, Shuguang Subdistrict, Nanling Subdistrict, Ziqiang Subdistrict, Minkang Subdistrict, Panshi Subdistrict, Qingming Subdistrict, Xinchun Subdistrict, Xiwu Subdistrict

Towns:
Jingyue, Xinlicheng, Xinhu

Townships:
Xingfu Township, Nonglin Township

Luyuan District
Subdistricts:
Chuncheng Subdistrict, Puyang Subdistrict, Zhengyang Subdistrict, Dongfeng Subdistrict, Jincheng Subdistrict, Tiexi Subdistrict, Qingnian Road Subdistrict

The only town is Hexin

Townships:
Chengxi Township, Xixin Township

Shuangyang District
Subdistricts:
Pinghu Subdistrict, Yunshan Subdistrict, Sheling Subdistrict, Shanhe Subdistrict

Towns:
Taiping, Luxiang, Tuding, Qijia

The only township is Shuangyingzi Hui Ethnic Township

Dehui
Subdistricts:
Shengli Subdistrict, Jianshe Subdistrict, Huifa Subdistrict, Xiajiadian Subdistrict

Towns:
Daqingzui, Guojia, Songhuajiang, Dajiagou, Dafangshen, Chalukou, Zhuchengzi, Buhai, Tiantai, Caiyuanzi

Townships:
Tongtai Township, Biangang Township, Wutai Township, Chaoyang Township

Jiutai
Subdistricts:
Tuanjie Subdistrict, Gongnong Subdistrict, Nanshan Subdistrict, Yingcheng Subdistrict, Huoshiling Subdistrict

Towns:
Tumenling, Xiyingcheng, Mushihe, Qitamu, Shanghewan, Yinmahe, Chengzijie, Xinglong, Weizigou

Townships:
Hujia Hui Ethnic Township, Mangka Manchu Ethnic Township

Yushu
Subdistricts:
Huachang Subdistrict, Zhengyang Subdistrict, Peiying Subdistrict, Chengjiao Subdistrict

Towns:
Sihe, Daling, Dapo, Huaijia, Tuqiao, Xinli, Heilin, Wukeshu, Minjia, Xiangyang, Gongpeng, Baoshou, Xiushui, Liujia, Bahao, Xinzhuang

Townships:
Huancheng Township, Chengfa Township, Lihe Township, Yujia Township, Qingding Township, Shisihu Township, Guangming Township, Xiejia Township, Fu'an Township, Dayu Township, Xuanfeng Township, Qianjin Township, Wulong Township, Dagang Township, Shuangjing Township, Hongxing Township, Siyu Township, Tai'an Township, Yumin Township, Qingshan Township, Yanhe Korean Ethnic Township

Nong'an County
Towns:
Nong'an, Fulongquan, Halahai, Kaoshan, Kai'an, Shaoguo, Gaojiadian, Huajia, Sanshengyu, Bajilei

Townships:
Qiangang Township, Longwang Township, Sangang Township, Wanshun Township, Yangshulin Township, Yong'an Township, Qingshankou Township, Huangyuquan Township, Xinnong Township, Wanjinta Township, Xiaochengzi Township

Baicheng

Taobei District
Subdistricts:
Haiming Subdistrict, Changqing Subdistrict, Ruiguang Subdistrict, Mingren Subdistrict, Tiedong Subdistrict, Chengnan Subdistrict, Xinli Subdistrict, Xingfu Subdistrict, Xinhua Subdistrict, Baoping Subdistrict, Xijiao Subdistrict

Towns:
Ping'an, Qingshan, Linhai, Taohe, Pingtai, Daobao, Lingxia

Townships:
Dongfeng Township, Sanhe Township, Dongsheng Township, Jinxiang Township, Deshun Mongol Ethnic Township

Da'an
Subdistricts:
Huiyang Subdistrict, Linjiang Subdistrict, Changhong Subdistrict, Anbei Subdistrict, Jinhua Subdistrict

Towns:
Yueliangpao, Anguang, Fengshou, Xinping'an, Liangjiazi, Sheli, Dagangzi, Chagan, Longzhao, Taishan, Shaoguo, Lesheng

Townships:
Sikeshu Township, Lianhe Township, Dalai Township, Honggangzi Township, Haituo Township, Xin'aili Mongol Ethnic Township

Taonan
Subdistricts:
Tuanjie Subdistrict, Fuwen Subdistrict, Guangming Subdistrict, Xinglong Subdistrict, Yongkang Subdistrict, Tongda Subdistrict, Taofu Subdistrict, Xiangyang Subdistrict

Towns:
Wafang, Wanbao, Heishui, Najin, Anding, Fushun

Townships:
Wanbao Township, Jubao Township, Dongsheng Township, Yema Township, Yongmao Township, Xingye Township, Jiaoliuhe Township, Datong Township, Erlong Township, Hulitu Mongol Ethnic Township, Huhecheli Mongol Ethnic Township

Tongyu County
Towns:
Kaitong, Zhanyu, Shuanggang, Xinglongshan, Bianzhao, Hongxing, Xinhua, Wulanhua

Townships:
Yangjing Township, Yongqing Township, Xinfa Township, Xinxing Township, Tuanjie Township, Shihuadao Township, Bamian Township, Sugongtuo Township, Xianghai Mongol Ethnic Township, Baolawendu Mongol Ethnic Township

Zhenlai County
Towns:
Zhenlai, Tanyu, Dongzhan, Datun, Daobao, Yanjiang, Wukeshu

Townships:
Danchai Township, Chaitai Township, Heiyupao Township, Shengli Township, Baomin Township, Jianping Township, Gashigen Township, Yinghua Township, Hatuqi Mongol Ethnic Township, Momoge Mongol Ethnic Township

Baishan

Hunjiang District
Subdistricts:
Xinjian Subdistrict, Tonggou Subdistrict, Dongxing Subdistrict, Hongqi Subdistrict, Banshi Subdistrict, Hekou Subdistrict, Chengnan Subdistrict, Jiangbei Subdistrict

Towns:
Qidaojiang, Liudaojiang, Hongtuya, Sandaogou

Jiangyuan District
Towns:
Sunjiabaozi, Wangou, Songshu, Sanchazi, Zhazi, Shiren, Dayangcha

Townships:
Dashiren Township, Dashipengzi Township, Yumuqiaozi Township

Linjiang
Subdistricts:
Jianguo Subdistrict, Xinshi Subdistrict, Xinglong Subdistrict, Dahu Subdistrict, Sengong Subdistrict, Dalizi Subdistrict

Towns:
Huashu, Liudaogou, Weishahe, Huashan, Naozhi, Sidaogou

The only township is Mayihe Township

Changbai Korean Autonomous County
Towns:
Changbai (长白镇 / 장백진), Shisidaogou (十四道沟镇 / 십사도구진), Badaogou (八道沟镇 / 팔도구진), Malugou (马鹿沟镇 / 마록구진), Shi'erdaogou (十二道沟镇 / 십이도구진), Xinfangzi (新房子镇 / 신방자진), Baoquanshan (宝泉山镇 / 보천산진)

The only township is Longgang Township (龙岗乡 / 금화향)

Fusong County
Towns:
Fusong, Songjianghe, Quanyang, Xianrenqiao, Xingcan, Xintunzi, Wanliang, Lushuihe, Donggang, Manjiang, Yushu, Beigang

Townships:
Xinglong Township, Xigang Township, Choushui Township, Songjiang Township, Yanjiang Township, Songjiao Township

Jingyu County
Towns:
Jingyu, Sandaohu, Huayuankou, Xinancha, Longquan, Na'erhong, Jingshan

Townships:
Yushuchuan Township, Yanping Township, Dongxing Township, Chisong Township, Mengjiang Township

Jilin City

Changyi District
Subdistricts:
Hadawan Subdistrict, Xinghua Subdistrict, Yanjiang Subdistrict, Yan'an Subdistrict, Minzhu Subdistrict, Tongjiang Subdistrict, Wenmiao Subdistrict, Qiachunli Subdistrict, Weichang Subdistrict, Xindihao Subdistrict, Zhanqian Subdistrict, Lianhua Subdistrict, Xinjian Subdistrict, Dongjuzi Subdistrict, Shuangji Subdistrict, Jiuzhan Subdistrict

Towns:
Gudianzi, Huapichang, Zuojia

Townships:
Jiuzhan Township

Chuanying District
Subdistricts:
Dadong Subdistrict, Nanjing Subdistrict, Xiangyang Subdistrict, Qingdao Subdistrict, Henan Subdistrict, Beiji Subdistrict, Zhihe Subdistrict, Desheng Subdistrict, Linjiang Subdistrict, Changchun Road Subdistrict, Huangqitun Subdistrict, Beishan Subdistrict

Townships:
Huanxi Township, Shahezi Township

Fengman District
Subdistricts:
Shijingou Subdistrict, Hongqi Subdistrict, Jiangnan Subdistrict, Dachangtun Subdistrict, Gaoxin Subdistrict

The only town is Wangqi

Townships:
Fengman Township, Xiaobaishan Township, Qian'erdao Township, Jiangnan Township

Longtan District
Subdistricts:
Zunyi Subdistrict, Longtan Subdistrict, Xin'an Subdistrict, Longhua Subdistrict, Hanyang Subdistrict, Baoziyan Subdistrict, Kaoshan Subdistrict, Shanqian Subdistrict, New Jilin Subdistrict, Tuchengzi Subdistrict, Tiedong Subdistrict, Yushu Subdistrict

The only town is Wulajie Manchu Ethnic Town

Townships:
Jinzhu Township, Jiangbei Township, Longtan Township

Huadian
Subdistricts:
Minghua Subdistrict, Yongji Subdistrict, Shengli Subdistrict, Qixin Subdistrict, Xinhua Subdistrict

Towns:
Hongshi, Baishan, Jiapigou, Erdaodianzi, Badaohezi, Yumuqiaozi, Laojinchang, Changshan

Townships:
Gongji Township, Huajiao Township, Jinsha Township, Huashulinzi Township, Huanan Township, Sumigou Township, Beitaizi Township, Hengdaohezi Township

Jiaohe
Subdistricts:
Henan Subdistrict, Naizishan Subdistrict, Zhonggang Subdistrict, Minzhu Subdistrict, Chang'an Subdistrict

Towns:
Xinzhan, Tiangang, Baishishan, Piaohe, Huangsongdian, Lafa, Tianbei, Songjiang, Qingling

Townships:
Nangangzi Township, Qianjin Township, Chishui Township, Qingbei Township, Xinnong Township, Wulin Korean Ethnic Township

Panshi
Subdistricts:
Henan Subdistrict, Dongning Subdistrict, Fu'an Subdistrict

Towns:
Yantongshan, Mingcheng, Jichang, Quchaihe, Yima, Shiju, Futai, Hulan, Hongqiling, Songshan, Heishi, Niuxin, Chaoyangshan 

Townships:
Baoshan Township

Shulan
Subdistricts:
Beicheng Subdistrict, Nancheng Subdistrict, Huancheng Subdistrict, Jishu Subdistrict

Towns:
Baiqi, Chaoyang, Shangying, Ping'an, Shuiquliu, Fate, Xihe, Xiaocheng, Kaiyuan, Jinma

Townships:
Lianhua Township, Liangjiashan Township, Xin'an Township, Qili Township, Tiande Township

Yongji County
Towns:
Kouqian, Shuanghe, Chaluhe, Xiyang, Wanchang, Beidahu, Yilaxi

Townships:
Huangyu Township, Jinjia Township

Liaoyuan

Longshan District
Subdistricts:
Dongji Subdistrict, Xining Subdistrict, Nankang Subdistrict, Beishou Subdistrict, Zhanqian Subdistrict, Xiangyang Subdistrict, Fuzhen Subdistrict, Xinxing Subdistrict

The only town is Shoushan, and the only township is Gongnong Township

Xi'an District
Subdistricts:
Xiancheng Subdistrict, Dongshan Subdistrict, Fuguo Subdistrict, Xianfeng Subdistrict, Anjia Subdistrict, Tai'an Subdistrict

The only township is Dengta Township

Dongfeng County
Towns:
Dongfeng, Dayang, Hengdaohe, Nadanbo, Houshi, Yangmulin, Xiaosiping, Huanghe, Lalahe, Shahe, Nantunji, Daxing

Townships:
Erlongshan Township, Sanhe Manchu and Korean Ethnic Township

Dongliao County
Towns:
Baiquan, Liaoheyuan, Weijin, Anshu, Pinggang, Quantai, Jian'an, Anshi, Yunshun

Townships:
Lingyun Township, Jiashan Township, Zumin Township, Jinzhou Township

Siping

Tiedong District
Subdistricts:
Jiefang Subdistrict, Beishichang Subdistrict, Sima Road Subdistrict, Qima Road Subdistrict, Beimen Subdistrict, Huangtukang Subdistrict, Pingdong Subdistrict

Towns:
Shanmen, Yehe Manchu Ethnic Town

Townships:
Changfa Township, Chengdong Township

Tiexi District
Subdistricts:
Renxing Subdistrict, Yingxiong Subdistrict, Dizhi Subdistrict, Zhanqian Subdistrict, Beigou Subdistrict

Townships:
Tiaozihe Township, Pingxi Township

Gongzhuling
Subdistricts:
Dongsan Subdistrict, Tiebei Subdistrict, Tiedong Subdistrict, Henan Subdistrict, Hebei Subdistrict

Towns:
Fanjiatun, Xiangshui, Liufangzi, Heilinzi, Daling, Huaide, Shuangchengbao, Qinjiatun, Ershijiazi Manchu Ethnic Town, Sangshutai, Nanwaizi, Yangdachengzi, Baceng, Taojiatun, Bolichengzi, Chaoyangpo, Dayushu, Maochengzi, Shiceng

Townships:
Shuangyushu Township, Yulin Township, Baoquan Township, Shuanglong Township, Lianhuashan Township, Huanling Township, Weizigou Township, Liuyang Township, Yongfa Township, Sidaogang Township, Heqi Township, Fengxiang Township, Fangmagou Manchu Ethnic Township

Shuangliao
Subdistricts:
Zhengjiatun Subdistrict, Liaodong Subdistrict, Liaonan Subdistrict, Liaoxi Subdistrict, Liaobei Subdistrict, Hongqi Subdistrict

Towns:
Maolin, Shuangshan, Wohu, Fuxian, Wangben, Bolishan, Xinglong, Dongming

Townships:
Liutiao Township, Xinli Township, Xiangyang Township, Yongjia Township, Namusi Mongol Ethnic Township

Lishu County
Towns:
Lishu, Guojiadian, Yushutai, Gujiazi, Xiaochengzi, Caijia, Mengjialing, Shijiabao, Lamadian, Liujiaguanzi, Wanfa, Donghe, Taiping, Shenyang, Sanjiazi, Linhai, Xiaokuan

Townships:
Baishan Township, Shengli Township, Quanyanling Township, Jinshan Township, Shuanghe Township, Sikeshu Township

Yitong Manchu Autonomous County
Towns:
Yitong, Yingchengzi, *Kaoshan, Dagushan, Xiaogushan, Yidan, Jingtai, Xiwei, Erdao, Heyuan, Huanglingzi, Ma'an

Townships:
Sandao Township, Xinxing Township, Moliqing Township

Songyuan

Ningjiang District
Subdistricts:
Wenhua Subdistrict, Linjiang Subdistrict, Gongnong Subdistrict, Tuanjie Subdistrict, Minzhu Subdistrict, Qianjin Subdistrict, Heping Road Subdistrict, Shihua Subdistrict, Yanjiang Subdistrict, Fanrong Subdistrict

Towns:
Dawa, Maoduzhan

Townships:
Chaoyang Township, Xincheng Township, Xingyuan Township, Gaiyou Township, Bodu Township, Fenghua Township, Xinmin Township

Changling County
Towns:
Changling, Taipingchuan, Jubao, Taipingshan, Qianqihao, Xin'an, Sanqingshan, Daxing, Beizheng, Yongjiu, Liushui, Lifasheng

Townships:
Sanshihao Township, Jiti Township, Guangming Township, Sanxianbao Township, Haiqing Township, Qianjin Township, Dongling Township, Santuan Township, Bashiba Township, Yaotuozi Township

Fuyu County
Towns:
Sanchahe, Wujiadian, Sanjingzi, Caijiagou, Gongpengzi, Zengsheng, Changchunling, Taolaizhao, Xinwanfa

Townships:
Sanyi Township, Yongping Township, Xiaojia Township, Erlongshan Township, Shiqiao Township, Yijiadian Township, Xujiadian Township, Gengxin Township, Dalinzi Township, Xinzhan Township, Simajia Township, Sheli Township, Xinchengju Township, Dasanjiazi Township, Yushugou Township, Qijiazi Township, Lalin Township

Qian'an County
Towns:
Qian'an, Dabusu, Shuizi, Suozi, Anzi, Rangzi

Townships:
Yuzi Township, Zanzi Township, Daozi Township, Yanzi Township

Qian Gorlos Mongol Autonomous County
Towns:
Qian Gorlos Town, Changshan, Haiborige, Wulantuga, Chaganhua, Wangfuzhan, Balang, Halamaodu

Townships:
Baodian Township, Pingfeng Township, Menggu'aili Township, Daliba Township, Jilatu Township, Baiyilaga Township, Hongquan Township, Eru Township, Taohaotai Township, Changlong Township, Wulantala Township, Dongsanjiazi Township, Haotemangha Township, Wulan'aodu Township

Tonghua

Dongchang District
Subdistricts:
Guangming Subdistrict, Minzhu Subdistrict, Dongchang Subdistrict, Longquan Subdistrict, Xinzhan Subdistrict, Laozhan Subdistrict, Tuanjie Subdistrict

The only town is Jinchang

Townships:
Jiangdong Township, Huantong Township

Erdaojiang District
Subdistricts:
East Tonghua Subdistrict, Taoyuan Subdistrict

Towns:
Wudaojiang, Tiechang, Yayuan

The only township is Erdaojiang Township

Meihekou
Subdistricts:
Xinhua Subdistrict, Jiefang Subdistrict, Guangming Subdistrict, Heping Subdistrict, Fumin Subdistrict

Towns:
Shancheng, Hailong, Hongmei, Jinhua, Xinhe, Shuguang, Zhonghe, Yizuoying, Shuidao, Yezhuhe, Kangdaying, Heishantou, Niuxinding, Dawan, Shuangxing, Xinghua

Townships:
Lilu Township, Shuangquan Township, Sibashi Township, Chengnan Township, Yimin Township, Xingling Township, Jile Township, Jiangjiajie Township, Wanlong Township, Xiaoyang Manchu and Korean Ethnic Township, Huayuan Korean Ethnic Township

Ji'an
Subdistricts:
Tuanjie Subdistrict, Liming Subdistrict, Chengdong Subdistrict, Tongsheng Subdistrict

Towns:
Qingshi, Qinghe, Toudao, Huadian, Yulin, Taishang, Caiyuan, Yangcha, Dalu, Renao

Townships:
Taiwang Township, Maxian Township, Huangbai Township, Taiping Township, Tonggou Township, Shuangcha Township, Guoshuchang Township, Liangshui Korean Ethnic Township

Huinan County
Towns:
Chaoyang, Yangzishao, Shansonggang, Jinchuan, Shidaohe, Huifacheng, Huinan, Qingyang, Fumin, Tuanlin

The only township is Loujie Korean Ethnic Township

Liuhe County
Towns:
Liuhe, Gushanzi, Wudaogou, Tuoyaoling, Sanyuanpu Korean Town, Shengshui, Liangshuihezi, Luotongshan, Ankou, Xiangyang, Hongshi, Hengtong

Townships:
Shijiadian Township, Liunan Township, Jiangjiadian Korean Ethnic Township

Tonghua County
Towns:
Kuaidamao, Guosong, Ermi, Ying'ebu, Xinglin, Sankeyushu, Jiangdian, Shihu, Guanghua, Da'an

Townships:
Fujiang Township, Donglai Township, Sipeng Township, Daquanyuan Manchu and Korean Ethnic Township (大泉源满族朝鲜族乡, 대천위 만주족 조선족 향), Jindou Korean and Manchu Ethnic Township (金斗朝鲜族满族乡, 김두 조선족 만주족 향)

Yanbian Korean Autonomous Prefecture

Dunhua
Subdistricts:

Minzhu Subdistrict (民主街道 / 민주가도), Bohai Subdistrict (渤海街道 / 발해가도), Shengli Subdistrict (胜利街道 / 승리가도), Danjiang Subdistrict (丹江街道 / 단강가도)

Towns:
Dashitou (大石头镇 / 대석두진), Huangnihe (黄泥河镇 / 황니하진), Guandi (官地镇 / 관지진), Shaheyan (沙河沿镇 / 사하연진), Qiuligou (秋梨沟镇 / 추리구진), Aegmog (额穆镇 / 액목진), Xianru (贤儒镇 / 현유진), Dapuchaihe (大蒲柴河镇 / 대포채하진), Yanminghu (雁鸣湖镇 / 안명호진), Jiangyuan (江源镇 / 강원진), Jiangnan (江南镇 / 강남진)

Townships:
Daqiao Township (大桥乡 / 대교향), Heishi Township (黑石乡 / 흑석향), Qinggouzi Township (青沟子乡 / 청구자향), Hanzhang Township (翰章乡 / 한장향), Hongshi Township (红石乡 / 홍석향)

Helong
Subdistricts:
Wenhua Subdistrict (文化街道 / 문화가도), Minhui Subdistrict (民惠街道 / 민혜가도), Guangming Subdistrict (光明街道 / 광명가도)

Towns:
Toudao (头道镇 / 두도진), Bajiazi (八家子镇 / 팔가자진), Fudong (福洞镇 / 복동진), Xicheng (西城镇 / 서성진), Nanping (南坪镇 / 남평진), Longcheng (龙城镇 / 용성진), Dongcheng (东城镇 / 동성진), Chongshan (崇善镇 / 숭선진)

Hunchun
Subdistricts:
Xin'an Subdistrict (新安街道 / 신안가도), Jinghe Subdistrict (靖和街道 / 정화가도), Henan Subdistrict (河南街道 / 하남가도), Jinhai Subdistrict (近海街道 / 근해가도)

Towns:
Chunhua (春化镇 / 춘화진), Jingxin (敬信镇 / 경신진), Banshi (板石镇 / 판석진), Ying'an (英安镇 / 영안진)

Townships:
Hadamen Township (哈达门乡 / 합달문향), Machuanzi Township (马川子乡 / 마천자향), Mihong Township (密江乡 / 밀강향), Sanjiazi Manchu Ethnic Township (三家子满族乡 / 삼가자 만주족 향), Yangbaozi Manchu Ethnic Township (杨泡子满族乡 / 양포자 만주족 향)

Longjing
Subdistricts:
Anmin Subdistrict (安民街道 / 안민 가도), Longmen Subdistrict (龙门街道 / 용문가도)

Towns:
Chaoyangchuan (朝阳川镇 / 조양천진), Kaishantun (开山屯镇 / 개산둔진), Laotougou (老头沟镇 / 노두구진), Sanhe (三合镇 / 삼합진), Dongshengyong (东盛涌镇 / 동성용진), Zhixin (智新镇 / 지신진)

Townships:
Dexin Township (德新乡 / 덕산향), Baijin Township (白金乡 / 백금향)

Tumen
Subdistricts:
Xiangshang Subdistrict (向上街道 / 향상가도), Xinhua Subdistrict (新华街道 / 신화가도), Yuegong Subdistrict (月宫街道 / 월궁가도)

Towns:
Yuejing (月晴镇 / 월청진), Shixian (石峴镇 / 석현진), Chang'an (长安镇 / 장안진), Liangshui (凉水镇 / 양수진)

Yanji
Subdistricts:
Henan Subdistrict (河南街道 / 하남가도), Jiangong Subdistrict (建工街道 / 건공가도), Xinxing Subdistrict (新兴街道 / 신흥가도), Gongyuan Subdistrict (公园街道 / 공원가도), Chaoyang Subdistrict (朝阳街道 / 조양가도), Beishan Subdistrict (北山街道 / 북산가도)

Towns:
Yilan (依兰镇 / 이란진), Sandaowan (三道湾镇 / 삼도만진), Xiaoying (小营镇 / 소영진)

Antu County
Towns:
Mingyue (明月镇 / 명월진), Songjiang (松江镇 / 송강진), Erdaobaihe (二道白河镇 / 이도백하진), Liangjiang (两江镇 / 량강진), Shimen (石门镇 / 석문진), Wanbao (万宝镇 / 만보진), Liangbing (亮兵镇 / 량병진)

Townships:
Xinhe Township (新合乡 / 신합향), Yongqing Township (永庆乡 / 영경향)

Wangqing County
Towns:
Wangqing (汪清镇 / 왕청진), Daxinggou (大兴沟镇 / 대흥구진), Tianqiaoling (天桥岭镇 / 천교령진), Luozigou (罗子沟镇 / 라자구진), Chunyang (春阳镇 / 춘양진), Fuxing (复兴镇 / 복흥진), Baicaogou (百草沟镇 / 백초구진), Dongguang (东光镇 / 동광진)

The only township is Jiguan Township (鸡冠乡 / 계관향)

References

External links

 
Jilin
Townships